The Bani Utbah invasion of Bahrain led to the end of Persian rule in Bahrain and the annexation of Bahrain by the Arabs.

Background
After the fall of the Safavid dynasty, Bahrain went through a period of anarchy, dismay, and self-rule in villages which made the country vulnerable to foreign invasions. Utub forces often attacked the island during this phase, which made the spiritual leader of Bahrain, Sheikh Mohammed ibn Abdullah Al Majed, use the Huwala to combat the Utubs' attacks. These attacks continued throughout the early 18th century until the Utubs launched a full-scale invasion of the island and established a government loyal to the Sultan of Muscat. The Utubs were defeated and expelled by the Huwala forces loyal to Bahrain's spiritual leader who established a government headed by Sheikh Jabara Al-Holi (also known as Jubayr al-Holi). The Persian Afsharids led by former Safavid general Nader Shah invaded the island in 1737 and deposed Sheikh Jabara. Persian rule continued for 46 more years, with brief interruptions, until the Utubs finally took over the island in 1783.

Civil war and invasion
Sayid Majed ibn Sayid Ahmad Al-Jidhafsi was Bahrain's vice governor and the headman of Jidhafs who often clashed with his political nemesis, Ahmad ibn Muhammad Al-Biladi, the headman of the semi-autonomous village of Bilad Al-Qadeem. This rivalry reached its climax when an argument between the Al Khalifas who came to the island of Sitra to buy some supplies and a merchant escalated into a shoot out which resulted in the deaths of numerous Al Khalifas. Those who remained went back to Zubarah and informed their clan about the incident which caused outrage between the Utubs, causing them to send a naval fleet to Sitra with the intention of avenging their kins' deaths. After a disproportionate number of Sitra inhabitants were killed as a result of the rampage, the Utubs returned to Zubarah.

After news of the incident reached Bahrain's governor, Nasr Al-Madhkoor, he ordered a naval attack on Zubarah and sent numerous warships filled with well-equipped soldiers to fulfill this mission. However, the Utubs' spies infiltrated Al-Madhkoor's inner circle and as a result the Utubs crushed Al-Madhkoor's navy after plans of the attack reached them which resulted in a decisive Utub victory. Al-Madhkoor then headed to Iran to ask the troubled government, which was already suffering from its own internal issues, for help which did not arrive because of that country's bad conditions. Subsequently, Sayid Majed Al-Jidhafsi, who was substituting for Al-Madhkoor, personally asked the Al Khalifas and their allies to invade the Bahrain archipelago and promised them material aid and victory, should they do so. This action proved to have a lasting effect on the county and a civil war between the loyalist forces led by Sayid Majid Al-Jidhafsi and Madan Al-Jidhafsi, the Iranian governor's vizier and the rebels led by Ahmad Al-Biladi ensued as a result. The loyalists ultimately won the civil war.

However, by this time, the Al Khalifas and other Utubs had just entered the country, killed the vizier and successfully captured the islands of Bahrain from Nasr Al-Madhkur. The Al Khalifa family has ruled Bahrain ever since. The invasion was led by Ahmed bin Muhammad Al Khalifa, leading to him being named Ahmed Al Fateh ("Ahmed the Conqueror").

The Al Khalifa were supported by a naval fleet from Kuwait and several Bedouin clans based in Zubara in its invasion of Bahrain.  These clans included the, Al-Fadhil, Al Romaihi, Al-Noaimi, Al-Bin Ali, Al-Jalahma, Al-Musalem, and other families and tribes who later settled in the island.

Aftermath

The Sunni Arabs eventually began tolerating their fellow Shia Arabs and their formerly religious-based attacks now became directed primarily at areas inhabited by the newly arrived Persian immigrants whom they termed "al-Qajar", i.e., people of unrecognized foreign origins.

See also
 History of Bahrain (1783–1971)
 Qatari–Bahraini War
 Abdullah I Al-Sabah
 Tomb of the Unknown Soldier
 Bani Utbah
 List of Sunni Muslim dynasties

References

Conflicts in 1783
Military history of Bahrain
Battles involving Kuwait
Invasions of Bahrain
Al Khalifa invasion
Military history of the Zand dynasty
1780s in Iran